Anthony Fontana (born October 14, 1999) is an American professional soccer player who plays as a midfielder for Eerste Divisie side PEC Zwolle.

Youth soccer
Fontana began his recreational youth league development with Kirkwood Soccer Club in New Castle, Delaware at age 4. By age 10, Fontana had his first participation with the Philadelphia Union Academy and became a full-time participant in 2014.

Professional career

Bethlehem Steel 
Fontana developed at the Philadelphia Union Academy and made his way through to Bethlehem Steel FC, the Philadelphia Union's second team as an academy player. He made his professional debut against FC Cincinnati in July 2016 at 16 years of age. He would go on to make 8 appearances for Steel during their inaugural season.

The next season, Fontana saw an additional 11 appearances for Steel FC, and even earned an appearance for the Union during their summer friendly against Swansea City.

Philadelphia Union 
On July 17, 2017, Fontana signed a homegrown player contract with Philadelphia Union. Fontana became an active Union player on January 1, 2018.

On March 3, 2018, Fontana made his debut for Philadelphia Union, starting in the season opener against New England Revolution. He scored the opening goal of the season against the Revolution which was ultimately the game-winner. Fontana became the first Union homegrown player to score a brace when he came into the match as a substitute against the New England Revolution in September 2020. Fontana became a standout in the substitution role and finishing the 2020 season scoring six goals in 523 minutes of play, contributing the Union's first major trophy in the 2020 Supporters' Shield.

In the Union's debut season in the CONCACAF Champions League, Fontana became the first homegrown player to score a Champions League goal in a 4–0 home victory over Deportivo Saprissa, advancing to the quarterfinals. Despite being a starter at the beginning of the 2021 season, Fontana missed nearly two months due to concussion protocol. Fontana's contract concluded at the end of the 2021 season finishing with 51 appearances and 12 goals for the Union.

Ascoli 
In February 2022, Fontana officially signed for Serie B club, Ascoli. On January 31, 2023, Fontana's contract with Ascoli was terminated by mutual consent.

PEC Zwolle 
On March 8, 2023, Fontana signed with Eerste Divisie side PEC Zwolle on a deal until the end of the season.

International
Fontana was born in the United States and is of Italian descent. Fontana has appeared in the 2018 CONCACAF U-20 Championship representing United States.

Career statistics

Club

Honors
Philadelphia Union
Supporters' Shield: 2020

References

1999 births
Living people
American people of Italian descent
American soccer players
Philadelphia Union II players
Major League Soccer players
People from Newark, Delaware
Philadelphia Union players
Ascoli Calcio 1898 F.C. players
PEC Zwolle players
Soccer players from Delaware
Sportspeople from the Delaware Valley
United States men's under-20 international soccer players
USL Championship players
Serie B players
Association football midfielders
Homegrown Players (MLS)
American expatriate soccer players
Expatriate footballers in Italy
American expatriate sportspeople in Italy
Expatriate footballers in the Netherlands
American expatriate sportspeople in the Netherlands